Joe Barry (16 March 1876 –  29 March 1961) was a South African international rugby union player who played as a wing.

He made 3 appearances for South Africa against the British Lions in 1903.

References

South African rugby union players
South Africa international rugby union players
1876 births
1961 deaths
Rugby union wings
Western Province (rugby union) players